The University of Tokyo, Komaba Campus is one of five university campuses comprising the University of Tokyo. It is home to the College of Arts and Sciences, the Graduate School of Arts and Sciences, the Graduate School of Mathematical Sciences, and to campus services and advanced research facilities like the Research Center for Advanced Science and Technology (RCAST) and the Institute of Industrial Science (IIS). It is the campus for all freshmen and sophomore undergraduates.

Currently, over 7,000 students are studying at Komaba who are in their freshman or sophomore years; about 450 students are in the senior division, and about 1,400 attendees are graduate students. Students receive two years of general education before they choose their majors, a unique concept among universities in Japan.

History
The Komaba Campus is in Komaba, Meguro district, Tokyo. This area was called Komaba Meadows, which served as a hunting ground for the Tokugawa family. In 1878, the Komaba School of Agriculture was founded. In 1919, the school became the Faculty of Agriculture of Tokyo Imperial University, the predecessor of the University of Tokyo.

During World War II, many of the school buildings were destroyed. New buildings were not erected until the Faculty of Agriculture was transferred to Hongo Campus, at which time Komaba became Dai-ichi KotoGakko. The new buildings were constructed in the architectural style of the Hongo Campus. The Komaba Campus became the university’s College of General Education after being incorporated into the postwar University of Tokyo, and was later renamed as the College of Arts and Sciences.

References

University of Tokyo, Graduate School of Art and Science
UT-Life
()

University of Tokyo